Fever Charm is an indie rock band from Oakland, California.  The band was started in high school, with the current lineup falling into place while the members attended college in Boston.  Their EP, Retrograde, was released Summer 2016 through Wild Card Music Group.

History

Formation 
Fever Charm began in Oakland, CA in 2010 when singer Ari Berl, bassist Yianni Anastos-Prastacos, and guitarist Theo Quayle met in high school after their friends realized they all happened to share the same December birthday. Drummer JT Gagarin joined the trio while they attended university in Boston (Berklee, Northeastern). During college the band split their time between the Bay Area and Boston, building up a dedicated bi-coastal fan base in the process.

Sound of Summer EP
The band's first EP, Sound of Summer, was self-released in July 2014 and was featured on Live 105 Radio, Huffington Post, Good Music All Day, and more.  The title track, Sound of Summer, is featured on FOX's reality TV show Coupled.

Move to California and Retrograde EP
Upon graduating from Berklee and Northeastern, the whole band returned to the West Coast. Just after moving, the band was chosen to be part of the Converse Rubber Tracks recording program, and was sent to Sydney, Australia to record at Studios 301.  After returning from Australia, the band settled down and began writing and recording their next EP.  After almost two months of writing and recording, Fever Charm emerged from the studio with the Retrograde EP, and announced its release in May 2016.  The first single, "Love Letters", was released May 21, 2016.

Band members

Current
Ari Berl – Lead Vocals, Guitar (2010–present)
Theo Quayle – Guitar, Vocals, Keyboard, Synthesizer (2010–present)
Yianni Anastos-Prastacos – Bass Guitar, Vocals, Keyboard, Synthesizer (2010–present)
JT Gagarin – Drums (2012–present)

Discography

EPs
Sound Of Summer (July 2014) – Self-released
Retrograde (Summer 2016) – Wild Card Music Group

Singles

Television and film appearances
The FOX reality TV show Coupled featured "Sound of Summer."

Lenovo featured the band and "Sound of Summer" in an online advertisement for a new line of laptops and tablets.

References

Alternative rock groups from California
Indie rock musical groups from California
Musical groups from Oakland, California